Andrés Bermúdez Viramontes (2 July 1950 – 5 February 2009) was a Mexican agricultural businessman and politician from the National Action Party (formerly from the Party of the Democratic Revolution). From 2006 to 2009 he served as Deputy of the LX Legislature of the Mexican Congress representing Zacatecas.

References

1951 births
2009 deaths
Politicians from Zacatecas
20th-century Mexican businesspeople
National Action Party (Mexico) politicians
Party of the Democratic Revolution politicians
Deaths from cancer in Texas
21st-century Mexican politicians
Members of the Chamber of Deputies (Mexico) for Zacatecas